Weatherspoon is a surname that may refer to:

 Cephus Weatherspoon (born 1948), American football player
 Chuck Weatherspoon (born 1968), American football player
 Clarence Weatherspoon (born 1970), American basketball player
 Nick Weatherspoon (1950–2008), American basketball player
 Quinndary Weatherspoon (born 1996), American basketball player
 Sean Weatherspoon (born 1987), American football linebacker
 Teresa Weatherspoon (born 1965), American former basketball player and current coach
 William Weatherspoon (1936-2005), American songwriter

See also 
 Witherspoon (disambiguation)
 Wetherspoons, a British pub chain
 Wotherspoon